The Pyeongtaek–Jecheon Expressway(), Route 40, is an expressway in South Korea, currently connecting Pyeongtaek, Gyeonggi Province to Jecheon, North Chungcheong Province with planned extensions to Jecheon, Samcheok.

Originally assigned route number 24 during planning and initial construction, it was reassigned route number 40 in 2001 as part of the new South Korean expressway numbering scheme. Construction began in December 1997.

The Pyeongtaek–Jecheon Expressway is part of South Korea's integrated tollway system. Motorists pay tolls only when leaving the system, not when transferring between expressways within the system.

Though the expressway's official name became "Pyeongtaek-Chungju Expressway" (평택충주고속도로) in 2002 and "Pyeongtaek-Jecheon Expressway" in 2008,

History

 27 December 1997 : Construction Begin (W.Pyeongtaek JC ~ W.Anseong IC)
 7 December 1997 : Construction Begin (W.Anseong IC ~ Daeso JC)
 12 December 2002 : W.Pyeongtaek JC ~ W.Anseong IC segment opens to traffic.
 8 August 2007 : Construction Begin (Daeso JC ~ E.Chungju IC)
 11 November 2008 : S.Anseong IC ~ Daeso JC segment opens to traffic.
 July 2009 : Construction Begin (E.Chungju IC ~ Jecheon JC / S.Jecheon IC)
 24 July 2009 : N.Jincheon IC opens to traffic.
 12 August 2013 : Daeso IC ~ Chungju JC segment opens to traffic.
 26 November 2013 : Geumwang-Kkotdongnae IC opens to traffic.
 31 October 2014 : Chungju JC ~ E.Chungju IC segment opens to traffic.
 30 June 2015 : E.Chungju IC ~ Jecheon JC / S.Jecheon IC segment opens to traffic.

Compositions

Lanes 
 W.Anseong IC ~ Jecheon JC / S.Jecheon IC : 4
 W.Pyeongtaek JC ~ Songtan IC, Anseong JC~W.Anseong IC : 6
 Songtan IC ~ Anseong JC : 8

Length 
 127.5 km

Limited Speed 
 high 100 km/h
 Low 50 km/h

Line 
 File is made by Netizen named 'Nokcha-Hyanggi(녹차향기)' from 'Road Club'

Exits and Junctions

 IC: Interchange, JC: Junction, SA: Service Area, TG:Tollgate

See also
 Roads and expressways in South Korea
 Transportation in South Korea

External links
 MOLIT South Korean Government Transport Department
 KEC Korea Expressway Corporation

References

Expressways in South Korea
Roads in Gyeonggi
Roads in North Chungcheong